Al-Zanghariyya was a Palestinian Arab village in the Safad Subdistrict. It was depopulated during the 1947–1948 Civil War in Mandatory Palestine on May 4, 1948, under Operation Matate. It was located 8.5 km southeast of Safad, near Wadi al-Ghara. The village was later burned and destroyed on June 17, 1948.

History
The village was named after the Arab al-Zanghariyya Bedouin tribe, who settled the area. 

In 1838,  in the Ottoman era, ez-Zenghariyeh was noted as  an Arab tribe, within the Government of Safad.

British Mandate era
In the 1922 census of Palestine conducted by the British Mandate authorities,   Zangharia had a population of 374 Muslims, increasing in the 1931 census  to 526  Muslims,  in  a total of 97 houses.

In the 1945 statistics, the village had a total population of 840 Muslims with a total of 27,918  dunams of land, according to an official land and population survey.   Of this,  7,265   dunums  were for cereals; while a total  of 20,653 dunams was classified as uncultivable.

1948, aftermath
Al-Zanghariyya became depopulated on May 4, 1948, during  Operation Matate  (lit. "Operation Broom"). On May 5, 1948, the Haganah "blew up most of the houses and burned the tents of Kedar’ between Tabigha and the Buteiha, where the Jordan enters the sea; some 15 Arabs were killed and the rest fled to Syria."

On May 5, 1948, Palmah sappers methodically blew up more than 50 houses in Zanghariya and other villages in the area.

A Catholic priest, in Tabigha noted: "When I just finished blessing the bread there was a terrible explosion in Tabigha. We rushed out and saw pillars of smoke rising skyward. House after house was bombed and torched, then matters proceeded toward the Jordan. All was bombed, the tents and the huts were burned. All day there were explosions, and smoke and fire were visible; in the evening the ‘victors’ returned with trucks loaded with cattle. What they couldn't take they shot . . . The mother of Big Awad and Old Dahan were killed."  Some the Zanghariya villagers later returned and were expelled again, apparently in  1949 or early 1950s. 

The private farm of Kare Deshe, established in 1954, also lie on the former village grounds.

In 1992 the village site was described: "All that is left are blocks of basalt that once had been parts of twelve houses. Although the houses have been demolished, some of their walls are still standing. Near the remnants of the village houses are stone barriers that form parts of livestock enclosures. The area serves as pasture for the cattle of the nearby Israeli farm, Kare Deshe, to the southwest."

Two books have been published about the village, one in 1999, and one in 2002.  In one of them, recalling the history of resistance between 1948 and 2000, the last name of almost all of the 35 men (killed, imprisoned,  fighters, and so on) is al-Zanghari, the Nisba of the village.

See also
Former and current villages inhabited by the Zanghariyya Bedouin tribe:
 Khirbat Karraza (Chorazin)
 Tuba-Zangariyye

References

Bibliography

External links
Welcome To al-Zanghariyya
al-Zanghariyya, Zochrot
Survey of Western Palestine, Map 4:   IAA, Wikimedia commons 
 al-Zanghariyya, Villages of Palestine

Arab villages depopulated during the 1948 Arab–Israeli War
District of Safad